Castilleja purpurea, known as downy Indian paintbrush, is a wildflower native to Texas, Oklahoma, Kansas, and Missouri. The flowers of various subspecies display a wide variety of forms and colors. Blooms may be white, pale yellow, peach, or tinged with pink and the foliage may be green or purple.

References

Orobanchaceae